The OMX Iceland 8 is a stock market index consisting of 8 largest companies listed on the Iceland Stock Exchange.
It was updated/replaced to/by OMX Iceland 10 index as of July 2019

Composition

Sources 

Economy of Iceland
European stock market indices
Nasdaq Nordic